Katharine Sarah Macquoid (Thomas; 26 January 1824 - June 1917) was a British novelist and travel writer, who published over 65 works. In addition to writing books, many of Macquoid's stories were published in magazines, the first story appearing in a publication called Welcome Guest, in 1859. Her first novel, A Bad Beginning: a story of a French marriage (1862), was successful. Probably her best story was Patty (1871).

Early life and education
Katherine Sarah Thomas was born in Kentish Town, London, England, 26 January 1824. She was the third daughter of Thomas Thomas, a London merchant, and Phoebe Gadsden. She probably inherited her literary bent from her mother, who was a lover of books.

Macquoid was educated at home. At the age of 17 or 18, she was taken to France, where she lived for some years, an invaluable experience, as she found afterwards.

Career
In 1851, she married Thomas Robert Macquoid, R.I.; he was a water colour painter, and a draughtsman in black and white. It was at her husband's suggestion that she began to write. A contributing factor suggested for her career as a professional writer, it has been suggested, was the need to find school fees for two sons at Marlborough College. She began with verse and stories for children, in The Welcome Guest, a weekly paper edited by John Maxwell, for which her husband acted as illustrator. A collection appeared as Piccalilli: a Mixture (1862).

In 1862, Macquoid's first novel was published, A Bad Beginning: a story of a French marriage. It was successful, and was followed by between 50 and 60 stories. Probably her best story was Patty (1871), which brought appreciative letters from John Morley and Sir Arthur Helps.  The heroine was decidedly more naughty than mid-Victorian heroines were wont to be, and the book had deservedly a great vogue, firmly establishing the author's position. Macquoid also made her mark as the writer of travel books, such as Through Normandy, Through Brittany, In the Ardennes, Pictures in Umbria, and In the Volcanic Eifel, which were illustrated by her husband.

Macquoid had her early struggles for recognition, but she was encouraged at different times by George Lillie Craik, George Grove, G. H. Lewes, and Sir Frederic Leighton. Her work was appreciated by parents as her stories were not only interesting, but could be read with avidity by young girls for they were not "silly" or of the "milk-and-water" variety. They were well-written studies of lives and circumstances which young girls recognized as similar to their own.

Personal life
The elder son was Percy Macquoid, R.I., designer and decorator. The second son, Gilbert Macquoid, was a solicitor, who edited Jacobite Songs and Ballads, and who assisted his mother in some of her travel books. She enjoyed reading, gardening, and foreign travel. Macquoid died at Tooting Commons, June 1917.

Selected works

 Piccalilli, 1862
 A Bad Beginning, 1862
 Chesterford, 1863
 Hester Kirton, 1864
 By the Sea, 1865
 Elinor Dr den, 1867
 Charlotte Burney, 1867
 Wild as a Hawk (Marjorie), 1868
 Forgotten by the World, 1869
 Bookstone, 1871
 Patty, 1871
 Miriam's Marriage, 1872 
 Pictures across the Channel, 1872 
 Too Soon, 1873
 Through Normandy, 1874
 My Story, 1874 
 The Evil Eye, 1875
 Diane, 1875
 Lost Rose, 1876
 Through Brittany, 1877
 Doris Barugh, 1877
 Pictures and Legends from Normandy and Brittany, 1878 (with T. R. Macquoid)
 The Berkshire Lady, 1879 
 In the Sweet Spring Time, 1880
 Beside the River, 1881 
 Little Fifine, 1881
 In the Ardennes, 1881
 A Faithful Lover, 1882 
 Her Sailor Love, 1888
 About Yorkshire, 1883 (with T. R. Macquoid)
 Under the Snow, 1884 
 Louisa, 1885 
 A Strange Company; and The Light on the Seine, 1885 
 At the Red Glove, 1885
 A Little Vagabond, 1886 
 Joan Wentworth, 1886
 Sir James Appleby, 1886
 Mere Suzanne, 1886
 At the Peacock, 1887
 Puff, 1888
 Elizabeth Morley, 1889
 Roger Ferron, 1889
 Pepin, 1889
 The Old Courtyard, 1890 
 Cosette, 1890
 The Haunted Fountain, 1890 
 At an old Chateau, 1891 
 Driftin Apart, 1891
 The Prince's Whim, 1891 
 Maisie Derrick, 1892 
 Miss Eyon of Eyoncourt, 1892
 Berris, 1893 
 In an Orchard, 1894
 Appledore Farm, 1894 
 His Last Card, 1895
 In the Volcanic Eifel, 1896  (with Gilbert S. Macquoid)
 The Story of Lois, 1898
 A Ward of the King, 1898

References

Attribution

Bibliography

External links

 
 
 Katherine S. Macquoid at Cambridge Core Orlando Project 

1824 births
1917 deaths
19th-century English novelists
19th-century English women writers
People from Kentish Town
Writers from London
English travel writers
English women novelists
British women travel writers
English children's writers
British women children's writers
English women non-fiction writers